is a 1992 Japanese film by filmmaker Juzo Itami. It is also known by the titles Minbo: the Gentle Art of Japanese Extortion, The Gangster's Moll and The Anti-Extortion Woman. The film was widely popular in Japan and a critical success internationally. It satirizes the yakuza, who retaliated for their portrayal in the film by assaulting the director.

Plot summary
The owner of a high-class Japanese hotel, the Europa, hopes to win a prestigious and lucrative contract for the hotel as the site of a summit meeting between important international officials. Unfortunately, the yakuza have taken a liking to this hotel as both a hangout and a target for extortion.  In order to win the contract, the owner realizes, he must rid the hotel of the yakuza.  Fearing to confront them himself, he deputizes a hotel accountant, Suzuki (Yasuo Daichi) and a bellboy and former college sumo-club member, Wakasugi (Takehiro Murata). The hapless pair are no more daring than their employer, however, and their tentative attempts to address the problem fail until they meet Mahiru Inoue (Nobuko Miyamoto), a lawyer who specializes in dealing with the yakuza. With Inoue's direction, the hotel staff comes together to face down the yakuza ruffians, who are portrayed as craven, outwardly-threatening-but-inwardly-weak, fools.

Definition of "minbo"
The word "minbo" is a contraction of minji kainyū bōryoku (民事介入暴力), literally translated as "violent intervention in civil affairs". It was a technique utilized by the yakuza following the crackdown of traditionally "victimless" crimes of drugs, gambling, and prostitution in the early 1980s, and exploited the Japanese reluctance towards confrontation in order to "gently extort" money from otherwise innocent individuals by making a scene with implied threats of violence over trivial matters.

Attack against Juzo Itami
The yakuza, who prefer to think of themselves as something akin to modern-day samurai, were angered by their portrayal in Minbo as common thugs and bullies. Three knife-wielding members of the Goto-gumi yakuza gang attacked director Juzo Itami near his home on May 22, 1992, six days after the movie opened. Itami was beaten and had his face slashed. The brutality of the attack, combined with Itami's popularity and the success of Minbo, led to a public outcry and a government crackdown against yakuza activity. Itami's 1997 death is alleged to have been murder disguised as suicide, carried out to prevent him from making a further film about the Yakuza. A former member of the Goto-gumi recounted the murder as follows: "We set it up to stage his murder as a suicide. We dragged him up to the rooftop and put a gun in his face. We gave him a choice: jump and you might live or stay and we'll blow your face off. He jumped. He didn't live."

Cast
 Nobuko Miyamoto as Mahiru Inoue	
 Yasuo Daichi as Suzuki the accountant
 Takehiro Murata as Wakasugi the bellboy
 Akira Takarada as Kobayashi the general manager
 Hosei Komatsu as Hanaoka
 Noboru Mitani as the yakuza boss
 Gorō Mutsumi
 Akira Nakao
 Shirō Itō as Iriuchi
 Hideji Otaki as the hotel owner

References

External links
 The New York Times Movies on Minbo
 
 Minbo  at the Japanese Movie Database

1992 films
1990s crime comedy films
1990s Japanese-language films
Japanese crime comedy films
Yakuza films
Films set in hotels
Films directed by Jūzō Itami
1992 comedy films
1990s Japanese films